"Arigatō (Sekai no Doko ni Ite mo)" is a single by Hey! Say! JUMP. It was released on December 15, 2010.

Information
"Arigatō (Sekai no Doko ni Ite mo)" is the second single by Hey! Say! JUMP for the year 2010.  They compiled their hits from their debut until this single on their first album, JUMP No. 1, showing how much the ten members had grown over the years. This single marked the beginning of their next stage.  The theme of the song is "Thank You" and how this is unique in every country.  Though the title is rather peaceful, the song itself is more of a hard dance number that will show that Hey! Say! JUMP have become adults.

The single was released in both regular and a CD + DVD limited version.  The CD contained the title song plus three different couplings, all with their own karaoke version, for a total of eight songs on the single.  The DVD version came out with the music video and making of the single.  The Jacket Designs were completely different between the two versions.

Regular Edition
CD
 "Arigatō (Sekai no Doko ni Ite mo)"
 "FLY"
 "Snow Song"
 "Futari Kake no Basho"
 "Arigatō (Sekai no Doko ni Ite mo)" (Original Karaoke)
 "FLY" (Original Karaoke)
 "Snow Song" (Original Karaoke)
 "Futari Kake no Basho" (Original Karaoke)

Limited Edition
CD
 "Arigatō (Sekai no Doko ni Ite mo)"
 "Arigatō (Sekai no Doko ni Ite mo)" (Original Karaoke)

DVD
 "Arigatō (Sekai no Doko ni Ite mo)" (PV & Making of)

Charts and certifications

Charts

Sales and certifications

References

2010 singles
Hey! Say! JUMP songs
Oricon Weekly number-one singles
Billboard Japan Hot 100 number-one singles
2010 songs
J Storm singles